The Women's 15 kilometre individual biathlon competition at the 1992 Winter Olympics was held on 19 February, at Les Saisies.  Each miss resulted in one minute being added to a competitor's skiing time.

Results 
These are the results of the event:

References

External links
Sports-Reference.com - 1992 Olympics Women's 20 km Individual

Women's biathlon at the 1992 Winter Olympics
Biath
Bia